The Municipality of Quito (officially the Municipality of the Metropolitan District of Quito) is the governing body of the city of Quito and the Metropolitan District. Its headquarters are at the Municipal Palace, located on the east side of the Plaza de La Independencia

Composition
The municipality is made of two principal organs: the mayor's office and a fifteen-member city council.

Administrative zones
The city and canton is administered through eleven Administrative Municipal Zones. Each zone, classified as either urban or suburban, has their own administrator and contain can both urban and rural parishes. They are (parishes covered in parenthesis):

Urban
Sur 
(Chillogallo, La Ecuatoriana, Guamaní, Quitumbe, Turubamba)
Centro Sur 
(La Argelia, Chilibulo, Chimbacalle, La Ferrovaria, Lloa, La Magdalena, La Mena, San Bartolo, Solanda)
Centro 
(Centro Histórico, Itchimbia, La Libertad, Puengasí, San Juan)
Norte 
(Belisario Quevedo, Cochapamba, La Concepción, El Inca, Iñaquito, Jipijapa, Kennedy, Mariscal Sucre, Nayón, Rumipamba, Zámbiza)
Centro Norte 
(Calacalí, Carcelén, Comité del Pueblo, El Concado, Cotocallao, Nono, Pomasquí, Ponceano, San Antonio)

Suburban
Noroccidental 
(Gualea, Nanegal, Nanegalito, Pacto)
Norcentral 
(Atahualpa, Chavezpamba, Perucho, Puellero, San José de Minas)
Calderón 
(Calderón, Llano Chico)
Tumbaco 
(Cumbayá, Tumbaco)
Los Chillos 
(Alangasí, Amaguaña, Conocoto, Guangopolo, La Merced, Pintag)
Aeropuerto 
(Checa, Guayllabamba, Pifo, Puembo, El Quinche, Tababela, Yaruquí)

Quito